Solenangis is a genus of flowering plants from the orchid family, Orchidaceae. It is native to sub-Saharan Africa.

Ecology
Solenangis conica grows on the preferred phorophyte species Podocarpus latifolius in humid forests at altitudes of 1600-1900 m above sea level among lichens and moss.

Taxonomy

Species
Solenangis has four species:<ref name = "POWO, 2023">{{cite POWO |id=30690-1 |title=Solenangis Schltr. |accessdate=15 March 2023}}</ref>Solenangis clavata (Rolfe) Schltr. - from Liberia east to RwandaSolenangis conica (Schltr.) L.Jonss. - Equatorial Guinea, Kenya, Tanzania, Malawi, Mozambique, Zimbabwe Solenangis scandens (Schltr.) Schltr - from Sierra Leone east to ZaireSolenangis wakefieldii (Rolfe) P.J.Cribb & J.Stewart - Somalia, Kenya, Tanzania

Species formerly placed in Solenangis
Seven former species have been transferred to the genus Microcoelia:Solenangis africana R.Rice from Kenya is now a synonym of Microcoelia africana  (R.Rice) R.Rice Solenangis aphylla (Thouars) Summerh. is now a synonym of Microcoelia aphylla (Thouars) Summerh.Solenangis cornuta (Ridl.) Summerh. is now a synoym of Microcoelia cornuta (Ridl.) CarlswardSolenangis cyclochila (Schltr.) R.Rice is now a synoym of Microcoelia cornuta (Ridl.) CarlswardSolenangis defoliata (Schltr.) R.Rice is now a synonym of Microcoelia aphylla (Thouars) Summerh.Solenangis grahamii R.Rice from Kenya is now a synonym of Microcoelia grahamii (R.Rice) R.Rice Solenangis longipes R.Rice from Tanzania is now a synonym of Microcoelia longipes (R.Rice) R.Rice 

Further species have been transferred to Dinklageella:Solenangis liberica (Mansf.) R.Rice is now a synonym of Dinklageella liberica Mansf. Solenangis minor (Summerh.) R.Rice is now a synonym of Dinklageella minor Summerh. Solenangis saotomensis R.Rice is now a synonym of Dinklageella scandens Stévart & P.J.Cribb Solenangis liberica var. villiersii (Szlach. & Olszewski) R.Rice is now a synonym of Dinklageella villiersii Szlach. & Olszewski 

And one species has been transferred to Rangaeris:Solenangis trilobata (Summerh.) R.Rice is now a synonym of Rangaeris trilobata'' Summerh.

See also 
 List of Orchidaceae genera

References

External links 

Orchids of Africa
Vandeae genera
Angraecinae